Carmen, la que contaba 16 años is a 1978 Venezuelan film and the sixth film directed by Román Chalbaud. It was shot in La Guaira, Venezuela, and based on a Prosper Mérimée novel.

Cast 
 Rafael Briceño
 Arturo Calderón
 Victor Cuica
 María Antonieta Gómez
 Miguel Ángel Landa
 Mayra Alejandra
 Bertha Moncayo
 Balmore Moreno
 William Moreno
 José Rodríguez
 Nancy Soto

References

External links 
 

1978 films
1978 action films
Films directed by Román Chalbaud
1970s Spanish-language films
Venezuelan action films
Films based on Carmen